The 1960 Brown Bears football team was an American football team that represented Brown University during the 1960 NCAA University Division football season. Brown tied for last place in the Ivy League. 

In their second season under head coach John McLaughry, the Bears compiled a 3–6 record and were outscored 212 to 100. W. Packer was the team captain.  

The Bears' 1–6 conference record tied for seventh in the Ivy League. They were outscored by Ivy opponents 184 to 45. 

Brown played its home games at Brown Stadium in Providence, Rhode Island.

Schedule

References

Brown
Brown Bears football seasons
Brown Bears football